Dermomurex indentatus is a species of sea snail, a marine gastropod mollusk in the family Muricidae, the murex snails or rock snails.

Description
The length of the shell varies between 25 mm and 33 mm.

Distribution
This species occurs in the Pacific Ocean from Mexico to Panama.

References

 Merle D., Garrigues B. & Pointier J.-P. (2011) Fossil and Recent Muricidae of the world. Part Muricinae. Hackenheim: Conchbooks. 648 pp. page(s): 214

External links
 

Gastropods described in 1857
Taxa named by Philip Pearsall Carpenter
Dermomurex